The women's canoe sprint K-2 500 metres at the 2016 Olympic Games in Rio de Janeiro took place between 15 and 16 August at Lagoa Stadium. The medals were presented by Pál Schmitt, IOC member, Hungary  and Thomas Konietzko, Board Member of the ICF.

Competition format

The competition comprised heats, semifinals, and a final round.  The top boats from each heat advances to the "A" final, and the remaining boats advance to the semifinals. The top two boats in each semifinal and the next overall best boat advanced to the "A" final, and competed for medals. A placing "B" final was held for the other semifinalists.

Schedule

All times are Brasilia Time (UTC-03:00)

Results

Heats
First boat progresses to A final and the remaining boats are qualified for the semifinals. The fastest three boats in each semifinal qualify for the 'A' final. The remaining boats in each semifinal qualify for the 'B' final.

Heat 1

Heat 2

Semifinals
The fastest three boats in each semifinal qualify for the 'A' final. The remaining boats in each semifinal qualify for the 'B' final.

Semifinal 1

Semifinal 2

Finals

Final B

Final A

References

Canoeing at the 2016 Summer Olympics
Women's events at the 2016 Summer Olympics